Alaska Route 7 (abbreviated as AK-7) is a state highway in the Alaska Panhandle of the U.S. state of Alaska. It consists of four unconnected pieces, serving some of the Panhandle communities at which the Alaska Marine Highway ferries stop, and connecting to the Alaska Highway in Yukon via the Haines Highway.

Route description

According to Alaska's supplement to the Federal Manual on Uniform Traffic Control Devices, AK-7 follows (from south to north):
 South Tongass Highway, North Tongass Highway (Ketchikan)
 Nordic Drive, Mitkoff Highway (Petersburg)
 Glacier Highway, Egan Drive (Juneau)
 Haines Highway, Haines to Border
No other segments are shown on maps.

The Alaska Marine Highway ferry service connect the segments, but the ferry ports are for most parts not located at the endpoint of each segment, so many of the endpoints are dead ends.

Tongass Highway
The southernmost piece of AK-7 is known as the Tongass Highway, and heads both ways from Ketchikan on Revillagigedo Island. The ferry service calls at Ketchikan. Within the city of Ketchikan, it's signed as Tongass Avenue from the northern city limits at the airport ferry terminal to the Newtown neighborhood, then continuing through downtown as, successively, Water, Front, Mill and Stedman streets, before becoming the Tongass Highway again after passing Coast Guard Base Ketchikan.

Mitkoff Highway / Nordic Drive
Another section of AK-7 is the Mitkoff Highway, traveling south from Petersburg to the southeast point of Mitkof Island. AK-7 also includes the short Nordic Drive, connecting the Mitkoff Highway to the north point of the island. The ferry service calls at Petersburg.

Egan Drive / Glacier Highway
Egan Drive, part of AK-7, is the main road through Juneau, replacing the Glacier Highway from downtown Juneau to near the Juneau International Airport. Beyond the airport, AK-7 continues along the Glacier Highway past Auke Bay to its northernmost point near Berners Bay. The extreme southern end of Egan Drive is known as Marine Way. The ferry service calls at Auke Bay. There were plans to extend the road north of Berners Bay as the Lynn Canal Highway; however, the project has been indefinitely shelved due to the state's budget crisis.

Haines Highway

The final piece of AK-7 begins in downtown Haines, where the ferry service calls, and follows the Haines Highway northwest to the border with British Columbia, Canada. In British Columbia, it continues north as the Haines Highway with no designation, eventually connecting with Yukon Highway 3 (which ends at the Alaska Highway at Haines Junction in the Yukon Territory).

Major intersections

References

Petersburg Borough, Alaska
07
Transportation in Haines Borough, Alaska
Transportation in Juneau, Alaska
Transportation in Ketchikan Gateway Borough, Alaska